It Happened in the Park is a 1953 film directed by Gianni Franciolini. The film consists of six vignettes set in the Villa Borghese gardens in Rome.

Plot
The story shows the lives of various people from different parts of society who, on one particular day, stroll through the park.

Servants and soldiers 
First morning. A group of Venetian waitresses meets in Piazza di Siena, where they take the children of the families they work for to play. One of them, Lidia, reunites with the group after a while, and she explains that she attempted suicide due to a love disappointment suffered by a soldier; another, Marietta, claims that she would be very ready to kill herself if a man made fun of her. She too is dating a Neapolitan soldier, who takes her aside and invites her to a night meeting in the park. After disdainfully refusing, and seeing the soldier engaged in courting a Swedish nanny, the girl disappears. Her friends look for her frantically, thinking that she may have thrown herself off the cliff of the Muro Torto; her fears vanish when she finds her again as she quietly watches a puppet show.

Greek 
Late morning. Some classical high school students have come up with a trick to avoid an almost certain failure. One of them, Anna Maria, made an appointment with the Greek teacher at the Sea Horse Fountain; she the girl has to pretend that she is in love with him and kiss him suddenly, so that the other classmates can secretly photograph the kiss and then use the photo to blackmail the teacher and get the promotion. The teacher introduces himself, and tells Anna Maria her sad story about her: after the end of the school year she will have to leave teaching because she is losing her sight. The student, moved, hugs him, but at the same time tries to cover his face so that the blackmail photo fails.

Cast
 Maurizio Arena - Virginia's boyfriend
 Margherita Autuori - Fanny
 Eloisa Cianni - Antonietta
 Eduardo De Filippo - Fanny's father
 Vittorio De Sica - Lawyer Cavazzuti
 Anna Maria Ferrero - Anna Maria, the student
 Aldo Giuffrè - Attilio Scandacci
 Leda Gloria - Fanny's mother
 Germana Paolieri - The traffic policewoman
 François Périer - The professor
 Gérard Philipe - Carlo, Valeria's lover
 Micheline Presle - Valeria
 Giovanna Ralli - Virginia
 Franca Valeri - Elvira

References

External links
 
 

1953 films
1950s Italian-language films
1953 drama films
Italian black-and-white films
Films directed by Gianni Franciolini
Films scored by Mario Nascimbene
Films set in Rome
Films shot in Rome
Italian drama films
1950s Italian films